The events of 1994 in anime.

Accolades  
Animation Film Award: Pom Poko

Releases

See also
1994 in animation

External links 
Japanese animated works of the year, listed in the IMDb

Anime
Anime
Years in anime